Alexander (Dena'ina: Tuqen Kaq’) is an unincorporated community in Matanuska-Susitna Borough, Alaska, United States. It is located within the boundaries of Susitna CDP.

History 

Geography 

 ANVSA Name Alexander, AK
 Land Area

Demographics 

Alexander appeared on the 1980 and 1990 U.S. Census as an unincorporated Native Village (ANVSA). It has not appeared separately since and as of 2000 & 2010, is located within the boundaries of the Susitna CDP.

Economy 

Alexander's economy is primarily a subsistence one: living off the land, supplemented by tourism (fishing/hunting guides) and harvesting/selling some renewable natural resources.

Arts, Culture and Recreation 

Alexander is surrounded by federal and state forest lands.

Government 
Alexander Creek is part of the Matanuska-Susitna Borough.

Alaska Native Village Corporation
Alexander Creek, Incorporated is an Alaska Native Corporation, incorporated under the Alaska Native Claims Settlement Act.

Stephanie Thiele Thompson, President
Alexander Creek, Incorporated
8128 Cranberry Street
Anchorage, AK 99502

See also 

 ANCSA Alaska Native Village Corporations
 Alaska Native Village Corporations

References

General References

External links
 Alexander Creek  at the Community Database Online from the Alaska Division of Community and Regional Affairs

Alaska Native village corporations
Anchorage metropolitan area
Road-inaccessible communities of Alaska
Unincorporated communities in Alaska
Unincorporated communities in Matanuska-Susitna Borough, Alaska